The Rochester Police Department (RPD) is the main law enforcement agency with jurisdiction over the City of Rochester, Minnesota.  It was  established in 1906. It currently has 204 employees.

The Department is made up of a police chief, 4 police captains, 9 police lieutenants, 25 police sergeants, and a combination of police officers and investigators that add up to about 102 total. There are around 60 non-sworn personnel.  

The department states that it subscribes to a philosophy of Intelligence Led Policing.

Rank structure

Organization
The Rochester Police Department conducts business under the Patrol, Investigations and Services Divisions.  Each Division contributes to the operations of the Department. In addition, there are Specialty Units that operate in conjunction with each Division.

Patrol Division
Units associated with the Patrol Division include:
 Police Training Officers
 K-9 Unit
 Special Enforcement
 School Liaison Enforcement
 Community Service Officers
 Community Action Team
 Animal Control
 Parking Control

Specialty Units
 Emergency Response Unit (ERU)
 Forensic Mapping Unit (FMU)
 Crime Scene Unit
 Crisis Intervention Team
 Honor Guard
 Prolific Offender Unit
 Drone Operators
 DWI Enforcement
 Law Enforcement Phlebotomist
 DMT/G Operator
 Drug Recognition Expert (DRE)

Services
 Staff Development/Training
 Fleet Maintenance
 Records Division
 Evidence Division
 Planning/Technology
 Communications Center
 Crime Prevention

References

External links
 http://www.rochestermn.gov/departments/police
 http://www.rochestermn.gov/residents/public-safety
 https://www.policeone.com/police-departments/rochester-police-dept3-rochester-mn/

Municipal police departments of Minnesota
Rochester, Minnesota